!!!, also known as Chk Chk Chk, is an American rock band from Sacramento, California, formed in 1996 by lead singer Nic Offer. Members of !!! came from other local bands such as the Yah Mos, Black Liquorice and Pope Smashers. They are currently based in New York City. The band's ninth album, Let It Be Blue, was released in May 2022.

Background and history
!!! was formed in the fall of 1996 by the merger of members of the groups Black Liquorice and Pope Smashers, while on tour. After a successful joint tour, the two bands decided to mix the disco-funk with more aggressive sounds and integrate the hardcore singer Nic Offer from the Yah Mos. The band's name was inspired by the subtitles of the movie The Gods Must Be Crazy, in which the clicking sounds of the San people's Juǀʼhoan language were represented as "!". However, as the bandmembers themselves say, !!! is pronounced by repeating thrice any monosyllabic sound. "Chk Chk Chk" is the most common pronunciation, and the URL of their official website and the title of their Myspace page suggest it is the preferred pronunciation. Offer cites Depeche Mode and Orchestral Manoeuvres in the Dark (OMD) as influences.

The band's full-length debut record came out in 2000 as a self-titled album on the label Gold Standard Laboratories. This was followed in 2003 by the single "Me and Giuliani Down By the School Yard", a lengthy track combining house beats with sinewy basslines, psychedelic guitars, and simple lyrics which quote the title song of the musical Footloose.

A second full-length, Louden Up Now, was released on Touch and Go in America and on Warp Records in Europe in June 2004. In June 2005 !!! released a new EP covering "Take Ecstasy with Me" by The Magnetic Fields, and "Get Up" by Nate Dogg. The following December, the original drummer for the band, Mikel Gius, was struck and killed by a car while riding his bike.

They released their third album, Myth Takes in 2007.

!!! is composed of Mario Andreoni (guitar), Dan Gorman (horns/percussion/keys), Nic Offer (vocals), Rafael Cohen (bass/various electronic devices), Chris Egan (drums) and Meah Pace (vocals).

Vocalist and drummer John Pugh officially left the band in July 2007 to concentrate on his new band Free Blood.
Vocalist Shannon Funchess stood in for Pugh during much of their 2007 tour. The band also shared membership with the similar, defunct group Out Hud (including Tyler Pope, who has played with LCD Soundsystem and written music for Cake).

Discography

Albums

EPs
 GSL26/Lab Series Vol. 2 (Split with Out Hud, 1999, Gold Standard Labs)
 Live Live Live (November 2004, Beat Records, Japan only)
 Take Ecstasy with Me/Get Up (June 7, 2005, Touch and Go Records)
 Yadnus (2007)
 Jamie, My Intentions Are Bass E.P. (November 2010)
 MEGAMiiiX Vol.1: Shake Shake Shake (2018)
 Certified Heavy Kats (July 31, 2020)

Singles

Other projects
 !!! (1997, tour cassette)

Footnotes

References

External links

 
Profile on Music Agency Website 

Indie rock musical groups from California
Musical groups established in 1996
Dance-punk musical groups
Post-punk revival music groups
Warp (record label) artists
Musical groups from Sacramento, California
1996 establishments in California
Touch and Go Records artists